is a 1969 Japanese film directed by Susumu Hani. It was entered into the 19th Berlin International Film Festival.

Cast
 Yuri Suemasa (末政百合) - Aido (愛奴)
 Kenzō Kawarazaki (河原崎建三) - Shūsei Saiki (斎木秀生)
 Kimiko Nukamura (額村喜美子) - Madame Enjōji (円城寺夫人)
 Rumiko Tanuma (田沼瑠美子) - Yōko (燿子)
 Kenzaburō Shirai (白井健三郎) - Professor
 Takamitsu Masuda (増田増田貴光) - Yamamoto (山本)
 Jusaburō Tsujimura (辻村寿三郎) - Detective Iwashita (岩下)
 Kiyoko Ōta (太田喜代子) - Harumi (波留美)
 Akira Matsumoto (松本章) - Man
 Kyōji Kokonoe (九重京司) - Mr. Sano (佐野)

Release
Aido: Slave of Love was released in Japan on 24 May 1969 where it was distributed by Shochiku.

References

Footnotes

Sources

External links

1969 films
Japanese drama films
Japanese erotic films
Films directed by Susumu Hani
1960s Japanese-language films
1960s Japanese films